Carl Offterdinger (January 8, 1829 in Stuttgart – January 12, 1889 in Stuttgart) was a German figure and genre painter and illustrator.

Book illustrations
Offterdinger was a student of Heinrich von Rustige. In the second half of the 19th century, Offterdinger illustrated numerous children's books, fairy tales, adventure stories, and broadsheets.

Offterdinger is particularly known for his paintings with scenes from fairy tales and illustrations of literary works such as The Nutcracker and the Mouse King by E.T.A. Hoffmann, Till Eulenspiegel, Robinson Crusoe, fairy tales from the Brothers Grimm, the Leatherstocking Tales, and Gulliver's Travels. In 1874, he illustrated the first edition of Theodor Storm's novella Pole Poppenspäler in the journal German youth.

Heinrich Leutemann and Carl Offterdinger illustrated a German fairytale collection, Mein erstes Märchenbuch (My first Fairytale Book), published at the end of the 19th century.

Some of his illustrations are now included in the Boston Harbor Museum.

References

External links
 
 

1829 births
1889 deaths
Artists from Stuttgart
People from the Kingdom of Württemberg
German male painters
German illustrators
19th-century German painters
19th-century German male artists